Umuahia is the capital city of Abia State in southeastern Nigeria. Umuahia is located along the rail road that lies between Port Harcourt to its south,and Enugu city to its north. Umuahia has a population of 359,230 according to the 2006 Nigerian census. Umuahia is indigenously Igbo.

Umuahia is renowned for being a railway and agricultural market center, which attracts traders and farmers from neighboring towns to sell their produce, such as yams, cassava, corn (maize), taro, citrus fruits, and palm oil and kernels. There are industries that help drive its economy, such as a brewery and a palm-oil-processing plant. Nigeria's National Root Crops Research Institute, at Umudike, is adjacent to the town. Umuahia also has several colleges including Trinity College (theological), Government College Umuahia, Holy Rosary Girls Secondary School and hospitals like the Federal Medical Centre, Umuahia (formerly Queen Elizabeth Hospital) .

Umuahia comprises two local government areas: Umuahia North and Umuahia South. These local governments are also composed of clans such as the Umuopara, Ibeku, Olokoro, Ubakala and Ohuhu communities.

History
According to popular legend, the name Umuahia derives from the Igbo word AmaAhia or "Ama Ahia", which means "market place or market center", respectively. The British, who arrived the region and annexed it sometime around the mid-to late 19th century, upon learning the name, mistakenly pronounced and spelled it as "Umuahia". Other legends exist regarding the origin of Umuahia, but the foregoing version seems most probable by consensus. In precolonial times, it served as one of the central marketplaces in the region for commerce. Given its serenity and proximity to other towns, such as Ohafia, Abiriba, Arochukwu, Obowo, Ngwa, Okigwi, Uzuakoli, Bende, Nnewi, Akwa Akpa (Old Calabar), and Kalabari, merchants of produce, pottery, crafts, textile, traditional medicine, palm wine, and tools travelled from afar, to trade at the busy market center, with many roads leading to it.

However, the name Ama Ahia was not the town's name; rather it was located in a place called Afor Ibeji, near Olokoro Town. With increasing British administrative and commercial activities in the region and yonder, Umuahia, as it came to be known and written, was relocated to Ibeku Town for better oversight by administrative offices and the convergence of roads at Ibeku.  The new location became one of the major trading posts along the rail route built by the United African Company (UAC) for carting produce, raw materials, and minerals along the trade route from Sub-Sahara to the Atlantic Ocean, for onward exportation to Europe. The trading post was named Umuahia-Ibeku Station to reflect the new market square and domain. Over time, the area became known as Umuahia, while the original market town at Afor Ibeji was renamed to Old Umuahia. The hyphenated Umuahia-Ibeku became a source of dispute, given that neighboring towns such as Ohuhu, Umuopara, Afugiri, Ofeme, etc., were constituted into the Umuahia administrative area, entitling them to be under Umuahia, not Umuahia – Ibeku, since Ibeku is on the same level as the constituent parts of Umuahia.

Umuahia, though comprising several villages and communities, is composed mainly of five sister clans, socially and phonologically homogenous at most, with each clan having its own version of autonomy, and social evolution.

Umuahia was established by the British colonial administration of Nigeria in the early 20th century. Umuahia was declared the second (and soon became the longest serving) capital, of the short-lived nation of the Republic of Biafra, on 28 September 1967 after the first capital, Enugu was captured by Nigerian troops. On April 22, 1969 Umuahia was occupied and nearly taken by Nigerian troops but they were forced to retreat, due to a stiff offensive by Biafran Maj. E.A. Eutuk. After Umuahia's capture on 24 December 1969, the last Biafran capital before its dissolution became Owerri.

Formerly known as Ikwuano/Umuahia Local government council until the Babangida-led government divided it into two LGAs—Ikwuano  LGA and Umuahia LGA in 1991—and then later in 1996, the former Umuahia Local Government Area was split by Abacha-led government into two local governments: Umuahia North and Umuahia South. The first executive chairman of the old Umuahia local government area is Chief Chibiko Ukanwoke, elected in December 1991.

Government College Umuahia and Michael Okpara University of Agriculture, Umudike (MOUAU) formerly Federal University of Agriculture (FUAU) now fall into the domain of Ikwuano people.

Umuahia Local Government Areas (LGAs) 
There are two LGAs in Umuahia, namely; Umuahia North and Umuahia South. Both LGAs are made up of Clans, and villages in turn, made up the Clans.

The South has three major clans, namely – Ubakala, Olokoro and Umuopara. Some of the communities/villages in Umuahia South constitute what is known as Old Umuahia. The Local Government council Headquarters is located at Apumiri in Ubakala.

The North consists of Ibeku and Ohuhu. Its Local Government council Headquarters is located at Ibeku.

Climate

Umuahia's climate is classified as tropical. During most months of the year, there is significant rainfall in Umuahia. There is only a short dry season. The climate here is classified as Am, by the Köppen-Geiger system. In Umuahia, the average annual temperature is 26.0 °C. Precipitation here averages 2153 mm. Precipitation is the lowest in December, with an average of 15 mm. Most precipitation falls in September, with an average of 322 mm. At an average temperature of 27.5 °C, March is the hottest month of the year. In August, the average temperature is 24.5 °C. It is the lowest average temperature of the whole year.

Notable people

 Felix Anyansi-Agwu, Former Chairman of Enyimba FC and current NFF Vice President
 Yagazie Emezi, Award-winning photojournalist
 Okechukwu Enelamah, Medical Doctor, Chartered Accountant, Certified Financial Analyst and former Minister for Trade and Investment (2015–2019)
 John Godson, Polish Lawmaker and Philanthropist
Uzoma Emenike, Nigerian Ambassador to the United States 
 Adaobi Tricia Nwaubani, Award-winning novelist and essayist.
 Akwaeke Emezi, Award-winning novelist
 OC Ukeje, Lagos based Award-winning Nollywood Actor
Chelsea Eze, Award-winning Nollywood actress
2Shotz, AfroRap Artiste and music producer
 Bright Chimezie, Highlife Musician
 Michael Okpara, Premier of Nigeria's Eastern Region from 1959 to 1966
 Johnson Aguiyi-Ironsi, Nigeria's Military Officer and Former Head of State.
 Uzodinma Iweala, US based Medical Doctor and acclaimed author of the bestselling book Beasts of No Nation. 
 Nnamdi Kanu, Founder of the Indigenous People of Biafra (IPOB), a separatist group.
 Samuel Chukwueze, Nigeria National Team Football Player.
 Ejike Asiegbu, Nollywood veteran

See also 
 Women's War
 Railway stations in Nigeria

References

 https://www.britannica.com/place/Umuahia
 https://en.climate-data.org/location/889380/

External links 

 Umuahia Progressive Association Inc. New York
 Umuahia Online

 
Cities in Abia State
State capitals in Nigeria
Towns in Igboland